Jean-Jacques de Beausobre (Niort, 15 March 1704 - Bisseuil, 8 October 1783) was a Swiss military officer.

Beausobre entered the French service in 1715 as a cadet in the regiment de Courten. He took part in the War of the Austrian Succession and Seven Years' War.

In 1743, Beausobre founded his own hussard regiment. He rose to lieutenant general in 1759.

References

1704 births
1783 deaths
People from Niort
18th-century Swiss people
Swiss military officers
French military personnel of the War of the Austrian Succession